Dendrobium compressum is a species of orchid. It is native to Thailand, Malaysia, Myanmar, Borneo, Java, and Sumatra.

References

compressum
Orchids of Asia
Orchids of Borneo
Orchids of Java
Orchids of Malaysia
Orchids of Sumatra
Orchids of Thailand
Plants described in 1842